Feiza Ben Aïssa (born 7 August 1963) is a Tunisian table tennis player. She competed at the 1988 Summer Olympics and the 1992 Summer Olympics.

References

External links

1963 births
Living people
Tunisian female table tennis players
Olympic table tennis players of Tunisia
Table tennis players at the 1988 Summer Olympics
Table tennis players at the 1992 Summer Olympics
Place of birth missing (living people)
20th-century Tunisian women